The Christian Democratic Alliance (ADC) is a political party in the Cartago constituency of Costa Rica. It was founded in 2012, and is led by Mario Redondo Poveda, a former President of Congress and former member of the Social Christian Unity Party. In the general election of 2014, Redondo was elected to the only seat in the Legislative Assembly won by the ADC. Another party of the same name was founded in San José but did not participate in the election. According to its statutes the ADC intends to enrol at national level in the future.

In the municipal election of 2020, Mario Redondo, as ADC nominee, was elected as Mayor of Cartago.

Electoral performance

Presidential

Parliamentary

References

External links
Official website 

2012 establishments in Costa Rica
Christian democratic parties in North America
Conservative parties in Costa Rica
Political parties established in 2012
Political parties in Costa Rica